Olympia, is a 2018 American romantic drama film directed by Gregory Dixon as her directorial debut and co-produced by McKenzie Chinn, Gregory Dixon, Lucy Lola Manda and Elliott Lonsdale for 30 Pictures, The Line Film Company. The film stars McKenzie Chinn in titular role whereas Charles Andrew Gardner, Ericka Ratcliff, LaNisa Renee Frederick and Penelope Walker make supportive roles.

The film received positive reviews and won several awards at international film festivals. It had its premier on 22 September 2018 at Los Angeles Film Festival. Then it was screened on 15 October 2018 at Chicago International Film Festival on 5 April 2019 at RiverRun International Film Festival.

Cast
 McKenzie Chinn as Olympia Welles
 Charles Andrew Gardner as Felix
 Ericka Ratcliff as Jemma
 LaNisa Renee Frederick as Grace
 Penelope Walker as Angie
 Sadieh Rifai as AJ
 Shane Kenyon as Damn the Man Dan
 Leah Karpel as Shane
 Stef Tovar as Scott
 Kelly O'Sullivan as Becca
 Charin Alvarez as Gabriella
 Larry Neumann Jr. as Jerry
 Andrew Goetten as Toph
 Joshua Rollins as Nathan
 Ben Fox as Hunter
 Cortney Mckenna as Nurse (as Courtney McKenna)
 Lee Palmer as Stan
 Nyimah Zavaleta as Young Olympia
 Timothy Farrell as Tony
 Emmy Neira as Jen

References

External links
 
 The Tale of Four on YouTube

2018 films
American romantic drama films
2010s English-language films
2010s American films